The Ambassador Extraordinary and Plenipotentiary of the United States of America to the Bahamas, usually simply called U.S. Ambassador to the Bahamas, is an official position and title appointed by the president of the United States and confirmed by the United States Senate by majority vote. The ambassador oversees diplomatic relations and foreign policy between the United States and The Bahamas. The ambassador lives in Nassau, the capital of the Bahamas. 

Due to political disputes, the United States Senate has not confirmed an ambassador to the Bahamas since November 2011, with the post either remaining vacant or held by interim appointees who are not ambassadors. Cassandra Butts, nominated for the post by President Barack Obama in 2013, died of leukemia in 2016, having spent more than two years awaiting a vote on her appointment. President Donald Trump nominated Doug Manchester in 2017 but the nomination stalled and he eventually withdrew. In May 2020, President Trump nominated William A. Douglass for the position; his nomination was eventually withdrawn by President Joe Biden in February 2021. In May 2022, President Biden nominated Calvin Smyre for the position.

List of U.S. ambassadors to the Bahamas
The following is a list of United States ambassadors, or other chiefs of mission, to The Bahamas. The title given by the United States State Department to this position is currently Ambassador Extraordinary and Plenipotentiary.

See also
Bahamas – United States relations
Foreign relations of the Bahamas
Ambassadors of the United States

References

 
United States Department of State: Background notes on the Bahamas

External links
 United States Department of State: Chiefs of Mission for Bahamas
 United States Department of State: the Bahamas
 United States Embassy in Nassau

 01
United States
Bahamas
Bahamas